Queer China, 'Comrade' China, directed by Cui Zi’en, is a 2008 independent Chinese documentary about homosexuality in China. The film features interviews with prominent academics and activists. Interviewees include the film's director Cui Zi'en, actress and activist Shitou, sociologist Li Yinhe and director Zhang Yuan. It covers 80 years of evolution of Chinese attitudes on LGBTQ people, ending with the 2003 Same-sex Marriage Bill.

Film Content

Organization 
The film consists of 11 "chapters" that discuss aspects and periods of homosexuality in China. Topics discussed include the decriminalization of homosexuality, its removal as a mental illness, the development of queer theory in China, and the appearance of gays on Chinese television shows.

Interviewees 
In order of appearance:

 Li Yinhe
 Qin Shide
 Zhang Beichuan
 Fuxi
 Shitou
 Guo Xiaofei 
 Tongge
 Pan Suiming
 Zhou Dan
 Cheng Qingsong
 Bai Yonggbin
 Zhen Li
 Zhang Yi
 Lisa Rofel
 Qiao Qiao
 Guo Yaqi
 Xu Bin
 Zhitong
 Binglan
 DongDong
 Xiangqi
 Fan Popo
 Mai Kiang 
 Zhao Jing
 Gogo
 Chung To
 Paul Crook
 Huang YingYing
 Xu Gehui
 Ming Ming
 Hao Ting
 Da Wei
 Wei Jiang Jiang
 Gao Yanning
 Zhang Yuan
 Yang Yang
 Li Yu
 Meng Nuo
 Zhu Ri Kun
 Wang Wo

Awards, nominations, and honors
 Pusan International Film Festival
Official Selection
 24th Turino GLBT Film Festival
Audience Award Best Documentary
 Shanghai PRIDE
Opening Night Film
 Beijing Queer Film Festival
Official Selection

See also 

 Recognition of same-sex unions in China
 LGBT rights in China
 Homosexuality in China

References

External links
 
 Queer China on dGenerate Films website

2008 films
Chinese documentary films
Chinese LGBT-related films
Films directed by Cui Zi'en
2000s Mandarin-language films
2008 documentary films
Chinese independent films
Documentary films about LGBT topics
2008 LGBT-related films